Shree Adi Manav is a television comedy series aired on SAB TV since 25 September 2009. The concept of it is just like the concept of film Tom, Dick, and Harry, with one blind, one deaf and one mute leading character. "Shree" is "Blind", "adi" is "Deaf" and "manav" is "Mute".This series was concluded on 10 July 2010 after successfully completing 45 episodes.

Plot
Shree (Vishal Kotian) is blind, living with his two friends Adi (Vrajesh Hirjee) (deaf) and Manav (Kiku Sharda) (dumb) in a lavish villa of his uncle. They are not disabled by birth but the handicap happened to them in an unfortunate accident. These three friends try new ventures, newer adventures and every exciting activity that creates confusion and leads to chaos. These incidents end up creating a situational comedy. Even if they are disabled, three of them are optimistic and sees the brighter side of life.

Cast
 Vishal Kotian as Shree (blind)
 Vrajesh Hirjee as Adi (deaf)
 Kiku Sharda as Manav (dumb)

References

Sony SAB original programming
Indian comedy television series
Indian television sitcoms